Greatest Hits Part 2 is a 1996 compilation album by the rock band Styx and a follow-up to Greatest Hits, another compilation album released in 1995. The album features 14 previously released Styx songs as well as two new songs, "Little Suzie" and "It Takes Love". Major omissions that were not included on either Greatest Hits packages are 2 top 40 charted singles, "Why Me" (#27, 1980) and "Music Time" (#40, 1984).

Track listing

Personnel 
 Dennis DeYoung -  keyboards, vocals
 Tommy Shaw -  guitar, vocals
 James "J.Y." Young - guitar, vocals
 John Curulewski - guitar
 Chuck Panozzo - bass, vocals
 John Panozzo - drums
 Glen Burtnik - guitar, vocals
 Todd Sucherman - drums

References

1996 greatest hits albums
Styx (band) compilation albums
A&M Records compilation albums